Charles Odartey Lamptey (c.1930 – 20 April 2022) was a Ghanaian police office and was the Inspector General of Police of the Ghana Police Service from 5 June 1979 to 27 November 1979.

Lamptey died on 20 April 2022 at the Ghana Police Hospital in Accra, aged 92.

References

2022 deaths
Ghanaian police officers
Ghanaian Inspector Generals of Police
Year of birth uncertain